Rushan Abdulkhakovich Khasanov (born March 27, 1956) is a retired Russian professional footballer.

Khasanov played in the Soviet Top League with FC Kuban Krasnodar and Neftchi Baku PFC.

External links
Profile at Footballfacts.ru

1956 births
Living people
Soviet footballers
Soviet expatriate footballers
Expatriate footballers in Sweden
SKA Odesa players
FC Kuban Krasnodar players
IFK Luleå players
Association football utility players
Neftçi PFK players
FC Torpedo Vladimir players